14 Artillery Regiment was a South African Artillery unit whose name was used twice. It was re-established in Potchefstroom in 1974 and was a full-time unit responsible for the training of Permanent Force and National Service personnel.

History

The original 14 Field Regiment
14 Field Regiment was initially formed in Bethlehem in the Orange Free State in 1962 with only one Battery, namely 143 Battery with an intake from Commando Regiments for their basic and individual training on the G1 and G2 guns with additional basic training on smaller weapons such as the 60 and 81mm mortars as well as .50-calibre machine guns.
During October 1967, 14 Field Regiment was relocated to Potchefstroom where it was disbanded on 7 November 1967 and its structures incorporated into 4 Artillery Regiment. Its operational Battery at Walvis Bay was renamed 43 Battery Walvis Bay.

Rebirth of 14 Field Regiment
On 13 May 1974 the unit was however reactivated and renamed to 14 Field Artillery Regiment and located outside Potchefstroom in September 1974.

New requirements
The SADF was interested in the 120mm mortar system and the activation of an airborne artillery battery. There was also an emphasis on obtaining 155mm guns. Gunners from 14 Field Artillery were therefore sent to Israel for training on the Israeli Defense Forces Soltam 120mm Mortar.

Structure
14 Artillery Regiment comprised the following:
 A Regimental Headquarters,
 141 Battery,
 142 Battery,
 143 Battery,
 2 Medium Battery,
 144 Battery (which became the first airborne artillery battery and subsequently allocated to 44 Parachute Brigade) and 
 32 Locating Battery.

Operations
14 Artillery Regiment took part in Operation Savannah (Angola) and provided the first troop of 25-pounders. It was involved from then on in most operations of the Border War. 14 Artillery Regiment was organized under 10 Artillery Brigade from 1983 forward for the final operations.

Dress Insignia

Freedom of the City

References

Artillery regiments of South Africa
Military units and formations established in 1974
Artillery units and formations of South Africa
Military units and formations of South Africa in the Border War
Military units and formations of South Africa